I'Magnifici Firenze are an Italian rugby league team in the Italia Rugby Football League.

History
They were formed in 2010 in the new Italian Rugby League Championship competition.

2022 Squad

References

External links
Magnifici Firenze Website
Magnifici Firenze Facebook Account
Magnifici Firenze Rugby League Facebook Page
MAGNIFICI FIRENZE RUGBY LEAGUE Facebook Group

Italian rugby league teams
2010 establishments in Italy
Rugby clubs established in 2010
Sport in Florence
Florence